Iolaus silanus, the three-tailed sapphire, is a butterfly in the family Lycaenidae. It is found in Kenya, Tanzania and the Democratic Republic of the Congo. The habitat consists of forests.

The larvae feed on Agelanthus subulatus and Agelanthus sansibarensis.

Subspecies
Iolaus silanus silanus (coast of Kenya, coast of Tanzania)
Iolaus silanus alticola (Stempffer, 1961) (Tanzania: north-east to the Usambara Mountains)
Iolaus silanus rondo (Congdon & Collins, 1998) (Tanzania)
Iolaus silanus silenus (Hawker-Smith, 1928) (Democratic Republic of the Congo: Equateur and Lualaba)
Iolaus silanus zanzibarica (Congdon & Collins, 1998) (Tanzania: Zanzibar)

References

External links

Die Gross-Schmetterlinge der Erde 13: Die Afrikanischen Tagfalter. Plate XIII 68 h

Butterflies described in 1889
Iolaus (butterfly)
Butterflies of Africa
Taxa named by Henley Grose-Smith